General Orlov may refer to:

Alexei Grigoryevich Orlov (1737–1808), Imperial Russian Army General-in-Chief
Alexey Fyodorovich Orlov (1787–1862), Imperial Russian Army lieutenant-general
Vasily Petrovich Orlov (1745–1801), Imperial Russian Army general
General Orlov (James Bond), fictional villain from the 1983 James Bond movie, Octopussy